The Dar Rapid Transit Agency (DART) is an executive agency of Tanzania with the mandate to establish and operate a bus rapid transit system in Dar es Salaam.

Strabag, an Austrian construction company, was awarded the mandate to construct the BRT system in February 2012.

References

Government agencies of Tanzania